José Manuel Nájera (born 3 September 1988) is a Colombian football creative midfielder. He currently plays for Unión Comercio.

Career
Nájera helped Real Cartagena gain promotion to Categoría Primera A in 2008. He was the club's top goal-scorer in the Primera A, scoring 21 goals in 88 matches in three seasons. and played for Real Cartagena in the Copa Mustang.

He played once for the Colombia national football team in 2009.

References

External links

1988 births
Living people
Colombian footballers
Colombia international footballers
Categoría Primera A players
Real Cartagena footballers
La Equidad footballers
Atlético Bucaramanga footballers
Association football midfielders
Footballers from Medellín